Deepika Abeykoon is a Sri Lankan netball player and center, goal defense of the Sri Lankan national netball team. Season held on 12-21 July.

References 

1989 births
Sri Lankan netball players
2019 Netball World Cup players
Living people